The Deana Carter Collection is the first compilation album by the American country music singer of the same name. Seven of the album's tracks were previous hit singles from her first two albums, Did I Shave My Legs for This? and Everything's Gonna Be Alright. The other tracks on the album consist of album cuts from those same albums that weren't released to radio. The Deana Carter Collection peaked at #54 on the US Top Country album chart. Capitol released this album after Carter had already departed from the label and resulted in no newly recorded tracks; although three tracks ("Rita Valentine", "Graffiti Bridge", and "Angel Without a Prayer") were previously available only in the UK version of her debut album and not in the U.S. version.

Track listing

Chart performance

References

Deana Carter albums
2002 compilation albums
Capitol Records compilation albums